Chionodes boreas is a moth in the family Gelechiidae. It is found in North America, where it has been recorded from western Alberta.

References

Chionodes
Moths described in 1999
Moths of North America